Events from the year 1804 in France

Incumbents
 French Consulate (until 18 May) then Napoleon I

Events
 21 March – The Napoleonic Code entered into force, forbidding privileges based on birth, allowing freedom of religion, and specifying that government jobs should go to the most qualified
 14 May – Napoleon Bonaparte was given the title of Emperor by the French Senate.
 18 May – First French Empire established.
 2–3 October – Raid on Boulogne
 November – Constitutional referendum  concerning the establishment of the French Empire
 2 December – Coronation of Napoleon I

Births

 3 October – Allan Kardec, writer (died 1869)
 19 October – Francisque Joseph Duret, sculptor (died 1865)
 24 December – Édouard Chassaignac, surgeon (died 1879)

Deaths
 28 February – Marie Louise Marcadet, opera singer and actress (born 1758 in Sweden)
 20 September – Pierre Méchain, astronomer (born 1744) 
 2 October – Nicolas-Joseph Cugnot, inventor (born 1725)
 15 October – Antoine Baumé, chemist (born 1728)
 2 November – Armand-Gaston Camus, revolutionist (born 1740) 
 1 December – Philippe le Bon, engineer (born 1767)

See also

References

1800s in France